The "Green Run" was a secret U.S. Government release of radioactive fission products on December 2–3, 1949 at the Hanford Site plutonium production facility, located in Eastern Washington. Radioisotopes released at that time were supposed to be detected by U.S. Air Force reconnaissance. Freedom of Information Act (FOIA) requests to the U.S. Government have revealed some of the details of the experiment. Sources cite  of iodine-131 released, and an even greater amount of xenon-133. The radiation was distributed over populated areas and caused the cessation of intentional radioactive releases at Hanford until 1962, when more experiments commenced.

There are some indications contained in the documents released by the FOIA requests that many other tests were conducted in the 1940s prior to the Green Run, although the Green Run was a particularly large test. Evidence suggests that filters to remove the iodine were disabled during the Green Run.

Oral history
Health Physicist Carl C. Gamertsfelder, Ph.D. described his recollections as to the reasons for the Green Run by attributing it to the intentions of the Air Force to be able to track Soviet releases.

See also
Atomic testing
Nuclear fallout
Unethical human experimentation in the United States

References

1949 in the environment
1949 in Washington (state)
Human subject research in the United States
Nuclear history of the United States
History of Washington (state)
Radiation accidents and incidents
United States Atomic Energy Commission